Paul C. Dinn is a Canadian politician. He represents the electoral district of Topsail-Paradise in the Newfoundland and Labrador House of Assembly, for the Progressive Conservative Party. He was first elected in a by-election in 2019.

Dinn was re-elected in the 2019 and 2021 provincial elections. His brother Jim ran as the New Democratic Party candidate in St. John's Centre and was also elected.

Before entering provincial politics Dinn was a director within the Department of Advanced Education, Skills and Labour. He was also a town councillor in Paradise.

Electoral record

}
|-

|}

References

Progressive Conservative Party of Newfoundland and Labrador MHAs
Year of birth missing (living people)
Living people